This is a partial list of Union Pacific railroad civil engineers who worked on the Union Pacific railway in its initial construction from Council Bluffs, Iowa to Promontory Summit, Utah from its groundbreaking on December 1, 1863, to its completion on May 10, 1869.

List

 Ainsworth, Danforth Hulburt, (1828-1904) 1865-1866. (Engineer in charge of surveys, 1865; Div. Engineer) 
 Appleton, Francis Everett  (1842-1877) 
 Armstrong,H.N. 1868-1869 (Division engineer - Cheyenne to Wasatch)
 Bates, Cpt Thomas H.  (1833-1927) (Division Engineer - Salt Lake City, Utah) 
 Bissell, Hezekiah (1835-1928) (Civil Engineer - UPRR, 1864-1869)  Bissell was involved in the construction of the Dale Creek crossing and reportedly made the decision to use rope and chain to anchor the bridge from high winds.  
 Blickensderfer, Jacob (1816-1899) 
 Brown, Percy T. (d1867)  and L. L. Hills (d1867)
 In July 1867, Mr. Percy T. Brown, (assistant engineer) whose division extended from the North Platte to Green River, was running a line across the Laramie Plains. His party was camped on Rock Creek where they were attacked by the Sioux. Brown was out on the line with most of the party, but those in the camp were able to hold the Indians off, but a small party out after wood, under a promising young fellow named Clark, a nephew of Thurlow Weed, of New York, was killed with one of his escorts, and several of the escorts were wounded. Brown, in reconnoitering the country, ... struck 300 Sioux Indians who were on the warpath. He had with him eight men of his escort. Brown died in the fight. 
 Case, Francis M. (1835-1912) 1865-1867. (Division Engineer - UPRR)
 Casement, John S. (1829-1909) (Casement Brothers construction, 1866-1869)
 Dey, Peter A.  (1825-1911) (Locating engineer; engineer in charge of preliminary survey-UPRR, 1863-1864.)   
 Dixon, Wiley B. 1864 (Engineering corp.)
 Dillon, Sidney  (1812-1892) 
 Dodge, Grenville Mellen (1831-1916) (Chief engineer - UPRR, 1866-1870; director, 1869-1973; U.S. representative - Iowa, 1867-1869)  
 Eddy, J. M., served with Dodge during the Civil War and part of the 1867 expedition wherein Dodge laid out the line to Cheyenne.
 Edwards, Ogden  1864-1865. (Division engineer - UPRR)
 Eicholtz, Col. Leonard H. (1827-1911) 1868. (Bridge Engineer - UPRR)
 Evans, James A. (1827-1887) 1864-1869 (Division engineer - UPRR) 
 Ferguson, Arthur Northcote (1842-1906) 1865-1869. (Second assistant engineer- UPRR Eastern Division) 
 Golay, Philip, civil engineer (1827-1898). Golay worked on the UPRR Eastern Division. 
 Gray, E.F. 1869. Civil engineer
 Harding, Henry, Civil engineer 1865-1870) (1837-1910), a Union Pacific Railroad engineer from Hartland, VT. Harding was one of the landowners shown on the map at a plot just west of Cheyenne. He entered into Norwich University in Vermont, in 1852, where he met Grenville Dodge. Harding worked on eastern railroads until 1865 when Dodge hired him to work as an assistant engineer on the Union Pacific. Harding's specific responsibility was the architectural backbone of the road; he designed bridges, station houses, roundhouses, etc. He would go on to work for the United States Engineering Corps, 1873-1890. He retired in 1890 to his hometown of Hartland.
 Hayden, Ferdinand Vandiveer, 1868-1869. (Geologist, author - "Geology of UPRR Route")
 Henry, John E. (Director - UPRR, 1863-1866; general superintendent and chief engineer - UPRR Eastern Division, 1864; general superintendent - N.E. road, 1864; chairman - committee on construction):
 Hodge, James Thatcher, (1816-1871) -1863. (Geologist) succeeded by David Van Lennep (1826-1910)  
 Hodges, Fred S. (1865-1869 Engineering corp - rodman; assistant engineer):
 House, J. E.  1864-1868. Future Chief Engineer of the UPRR, laid out townsites in Utah.
 Hoxie, Herbert Melville (1830-1886)  
 Hudnutt, Col. Joseph Opdyke (1824-1910) 1869 (Division Engineer) 
 Hurd, Major Marshall Farnam  (1823-1903) Dodge's staff engineer during the Civil War, who became unit chief in what Dodge called some of the most difficult Indian Territory.  Mount Hurd is named after him. 
 Kelly, J.H., 1865. (Engineering corp - chairman)
 Ledlie, James H. (1832 – 1882) bridge engineer   
 Maxwell, James Riddle (1836-1912) 
 McCabe, J. F.
 Morris, Thomas Burnside (1842-1885) 1869. (Construction engineer)  
(Resident Engineer) 
O'Neill, John 
 Rawlins, John Aaron (1831–1869) 
 Reed, Samuel B. (1818-1891) (Locating engineer - UPRR, 1864-1865; engineer of construction; superintendent of operations, 1866-1869)
 Rosewater, Andrew (b1848) 
 Seymour, Col. Silas (1817-1890)  
 Sharman, Charles H.  (1841-1938)  Sharman's journal of his working on the project provided the source material for Western fiction author Ernest Haycox to write a story called the "troubleshooter" in Collier's magazine in 1936. Thus, Sharman's manuscript written by a civil engineer became the basis for the movie, "Union Pacific", released in 1939.
 Sickels, Theophilus E., 1870. (Chief engineer and superintendent - UPRR, 1870)
 Williams, Jesse Lynch, 1864-1868. (Civil engineer; government director, 1864-1869)

See also
First transcontinental railroad
List of people associated with rail transport
List of civil engineers
List of US military railroad civil engineers in the American Civil War

External links
 Engineers of U.P.R.R. at the Laying of the Last Rail, Promontory 1869 Work (by Andrew J. Russell), identified by Oakland Museum of California.
 Nebraska State Historical Society Manuscript Finding Aid for Record Group 3761.AM: Union Pacific Railroad (Omaha, Neb.)
 Building the Union Pacific-From Wyoming Tales and Trails

Notes

References 

Sources
 Athearn, R. G. (1971). Union Pacific country. Lincoln: University of Nebraska Press.
 Dodge, Grenville Mellen. How We Built the Union Pacific Railway: And Other Railway Papers and Addresses. Vol. 447. US Government Printing Office, 1910. List of civil engineers on page 37 of 1910 material. 
 Galloway, John Debo. The First Transcontinental Railroad: Central Pacific, Union Pacific. Simmons-Boardman, 1950. Accessed at  
 Heier, Jan Richard. "Building the Union Pacific Railroad: A study of mid-nineteenth-century railroad construction accounting and reporting practices." Accounting, Business & Financial History 19.3 (2009): 327-351. Accessed at 
 Klein, Maury. Union Pacific: 1862-1893. Vol. 1. U of Minnesota Press, 2006.

Manuscript Collections
 Casement Collection, 1795-1959. c. 2,000 items. Incl. a large group of letters written by John S. Casement about the Union Pacific. Kansas State U. Lib. and Dept. of Hist., Manhattan. 60-1211 
 Casement, John S. 158 items. Incl. correspondence, relating to the Union Pacific, 1866-69. Huntington Lib., San Marino.
 Papers of Levi O. Leonard, Collection Dates: 1850 -- 1942, Special Collections Department, the University of Iowa Libraries, Accessed at 

 
First transcontinental railroad
History of rail transportation in the United States
Railway lines in the United States
Union Pacific Railroad
American frontier
History of United States expansionism
Rail lines receiving land grants
Railway lines in Omaha, Nebraska
Rail transportation in Utah
1860s in the United States
Historic Civil Engineering Landmarks
19th-century American engineers